Knock on Wood may refer to:

 Knocking on wood, an act of superstition

Music 
 "Knock on Wood" (Eddie Floyd song), a 1966 song by Eddie Floyd, covered by many performers
 Knock on Wood (Amii Stewart album), 1979
 Knock on Wood – The Best of Amii Stewart, a 1996 album
 Knock on Wood (Eddie Floyd album), 1967
 Knock on Wood (The Young Gods album), 2008
 "Knock on Wood" (1942 song), a song written by M. K. Jerome and Jack Scholl, from the film Casablanca
 "Knock on Wood", the title song to the 1954 film, written by Sylvia Fine
 "Knock on Wood", a song by Prefab Sprout from From Langley Park to Memphis

Film and television 
 Knock on Wood (film), a 1954 comedy starring Danny Kaye
 Knock on Wood (1981 film) or La Chèvre, a French comedy by Francis Veber
 "Knock on Wood" (Little Einsteins episode)
 Knock on Wood (TV series), a 1982 Canadian series written and directed by Phil Comeau
 "The Impression That I Get", a 1997 song by the Mighty Mighty Bosstones which repeatedly contains the phrase "knock on wood"